The Interlingua–English Dictionary (IED), developed by the International Auxiliary Language Association (IALA) under the direction of Alexander Gode and published by Storm Publishers in 1951, is the first Interlingua dictionary. The IED includes about 27,000 words drawn from about 10,000 roots. It also presents 125 affixes that facilitate free word formation. Its full title is Interlingua: A Dictionary of the International Language.

The foreword, written by Mary Connell Bray, briefly recounts the history of interlinguistics and IALA. The Introduction, written by Gode, explains the theory and principles of Interlingua and explores in depth the derivation procedures used to obtain a widely international vocabulary. Dictionary entries bring out the connections among words in the same derivational family, making the IED a useful resource for linguists, interlinguists, and others interested in language and linguistics.

References

External links 
 Search the Interlingua–English Dictionary online
 Full text of the Interlingua–English Dictionary

Interlingua publications